Margaret Christakos (born 1962 in Sudbury, Ontario) is a Canadian poet who lives in Toronto.

Life
Christakos was born and raised in Sudbury, Ontario. She is a Canadian poet, fiction author, literary essayist and creative writing instructor. Since 1989, she has published ten collections of poetry, a novel, an intergenre memoir including photography, numerous chapbooks and has appeared in a diverse range of literary journals and anthologies. Christakos received her B.F.A. in Visual Arts from York University in 1985. She lived in Montreal from 1985 to 1987, settling in Toronto in 1988. She went on to pursue an M.A. in Education from OISE in the History and Philosophy of Education in 1995. Christakos held a teaching position at OCAD from 1992-1997. From 2004-2005 she was the University of Windsor's Canada Council Writer in Residence. Additionally, she worked under PEN Canada in the political interests of exiled writers and has contributed to numerous poetry publications and events. She was an editor with Fireweed, with Women's Education des femmes, and with MIX: the magazine of artist-run culture. She worked for several years with Canadian high school students through the Writers In Electronic Residence (WIER) program and with adult students in the Creative Writing Certificate program at The University of Toronto School of Continuing Studies. From 2006-2011 she taught poetry and creative writing courses as well as designed and ran the poetry course Influency: A Toronto Poetry Salon. She was Publishing Editor of the online poetics magazine Influencysalon.ca. She is Associate Faculty with the Creative Writing MFA at University of Guelph-Humber. In 2016-2017 she was Canada Council Writer in Residence at Western University (London, Ontario). In 2017-2018 she was Writer in Residence at the University of Alberta. In the 2018-2019 academic year she is Barker Fairley Distinguished Visitor at the University of Toronto's University College.

She identifies as bisexual.

Work
Many writers have influenced Christakos' appreciation of literature. She has mentioned Nicole Brossard, Marguerite Duras, Daphne Marlatt, Erín Moure, and Kathy Acker, among others.

Christakos writes about the fluid and intersecting lines of sexuality and identity. In addition, she explores gender and motherhood in her work. She has shown an interest in recombinant poetics as well as in autobiography's formal and social concerns.

Selected bibliography
Not Egypt (Toronto: Coach House Books, 1988)
With all my heart i heard u speaking (Toronto: Ice Floe Press, 1991)
Other Words for Grace (Stratford, Ontario: The Mercury Press, 1994)
The Moment Coming (Toronto: ECW, 1998)
Wipe Under A Love (Toronto: The Mansfield Press, 2000)
Charisma (Toronto: Pedlar Press, 2000) (novel)
Excessive Love Prostheses (Toronto: Coach House Books, 2002)
Sooner (Toronto: Coach House Books, 2005)
Retreat Diary (Toronto: BookThug, 2005)
Adult Video (Vancouver: Nomados, 2006)
What Stirs (Toronto: Coach House Books, 2008)
Welling (Sudbury: Your Scrivener Press, 2010)
 Multitudes (Toronto: Coach House Books, 2013)
Her Paraphernalia: On Motherlines, Sex/Blood/Loss & Selfies (Toronto: Book*hug Press, 2016).
 Space Between Her Lips: The Poetry of Margaret Christakos, ed. Gregory Betts ([St.Catherines, ON: Wilfrid Laurier University Press, 2017].
charger (Vancouver: Talon Books, 2020)
 Dear Birch, (Windsor, ON: Palimpsest Press, 2021).

See also

Canadian literature
Canadian poetry
List of Canadian poets

References

Sources
"The Mansfield Press--Margaret Christakos." The Mansfield Press Website 
 
 Gregory Betts ed.:Space Between Her Lips. The Poetry of Margaret Christakos. Wilfrid Laurier University Press, 2017

External links
 Official website
Excerpt from The Moment Coming
Excerpt from Charisma
"What's Love Got To Do With It?: two Margaret Christakos poetry collections, wipe.under.a.love & Excessive Love Prostheses" by rob mclennan
Margaret Christakos at The Canadian Encyclopedia, accessed September 1, 2019
http://open-book.ca/tags/view/Main+tags/Margaret+Christakos
https://www.theglobeandmail.com/arts/books-and-media/review-welling-by-margaret-christakos/article1388864/
https://alllitup.ca/Blog/2016/Women-s-Writer-s-Block-Margaret-Christakos
https://www.thegatewayonline.ca/2017/09/margaret-christakos-writer/
https://www.woablog.com/tag/margaret-christakos/
https://www.uc.utoronto.ca/magazine/composing-community-margaret-christakos-frames-writing-life-social-pursuit
https://lemonhound.com/2017/10/10/margaret-christakos/
https://jacket2.org/content/margaret-christakos
https://jacket2.org/content/margaret-christakos

Canadian women poets
Canadian feminists
1962 births
Living people
Writers from Greater Sudbury
20th-century Canadian poets
21st-century Canadian poets
20th-century Canadian women writers
21st-century Canadian women writers
Canadian LGBT poets
Bisexual women
Bisexual academics
Canadian bisexual writers
21st-century Canadian LGBT people
20th-century Canadian LGBT people
Canadian LGBT academics